Abdel Nasser El-Gohary (Arabic: عبد الناصر الجوهري), an Egyptian poet, born in 1970. He published more than 8 collections of poetry and two plays, and won several awards including The Classical Poetry Award from the Egyptian Writers Union in 2016.

Education and career 
Abdel Nasser Ahmed El-Gohary Mohamed was born in the Governorate of Dakahlia, Egypt on 28 July 1970. He studied at Mansoura University and obtained a bachelor's degree of Law in 2017.  He is a member of the General Syndicate of the Egyptian Writers Union, the Association of Writers, and the International Islamic Literature Association, and he is also a lecturer in the General Organization of Culture Palaces. He was included in the literary dictionary by The General Organization of Culture Palaces in 2004, and was among the poets who were included in the guide of the Egyptian Writers Union in 2006. Also, El-Gohary's name was included in the Great Encyclopedia of Arab Poets in Morocco in 2016. El Gohary has published more than eight collections of poetry including the collection title "A Cry that Never Dries", and released more than two poetic plays. El-Gohary participated in several poetry competitions and won many prizes including the Classical Poetry Prize in the East Delta Cultural Competition in Egypt in 2000, the Central Literary Award for the General Organization  of Cultural Palaces in Egypt 2005,  and the Prize for Classical poetry from the Egyptian Writers Union in 2016. He was also selected among the top 35 poets in the Arab world in the Emirati competition "Prince of Poets" in 2008.

Awards 
He won several awards including:

 2000: Classical Poetry Prize in the East Delta Cultural Competition.
 2001: the Classical Poetry Award in the Literary Competition in Al-Nasr Military Magazine.
 2003: Prize for the literary competition held by the General Administration for Women’s Culture, Egypt.
 2003: Emirates Heritage Club Award
 2005: The Central Literary Award, Diwan Brach, Classical Poetry, the General Organization of Culture Palaces.
 2006: Prize for the literary competition held by the Sad Zaghloul Cultural Center in its seventh session
 2008: Award of the best 35 poets in the Arab world, “Prince of Poets” competition
 2016: The Classical Poetry Prize from the Egyptian Writers Union

See also 

 Amr El Adly
 Hossam Fahr 
 Magdi El-Gabri

References 

Egyptian poets
1970 births
Living people